Acacia penninervis, commonly known as mountain hickory wattle, or blackwood, is a perennial shrub or tree is an Acacia belonging to subgenus Phyllodineae, that is native to eastern Australia.

Description
It has finely or deeply fissured bark that is usually a dark grey colour. The glabrous branchlets are more or less terete and occasionally covered in a fine white powdery coating. Like most species of Acacia it has phyllodes rather than true leaves. The plant blooms throughout the year producing pale yellow flowers.

Taxonomy
The species was first formally described by the botanist Augustin Pyramus de Candolle in 1825 as part of the work Leguminosae. Prodromus Systematis Naturalis Regni Vegetabilis. It was reclassified as Racosperma penninerve by Leslie Pedley in 1986 then transferred back to genus Acacia in 2006. Other synonyms include; Acacia impressa, Acacia penninervis var. impressa and Acacia impressa var. impressa.

Varieties 
Acacia penninervis var. longiracemosa
Acacia penninervis var. penninervis

Distribution
It occurs in the Australian 
states of the Australian Capital Territory, New South Wales, Queensland and Victoria, and as an introduced species on New Zealand's North Island and South Island. The variety A. p. var. penninervis occurs in the same Australian states of the Australian Capital Territory, New South Wales, Queensland, and Victoria. The variety A. p. var. longiracemosa occurs in coastal districts of southern Queensland, and northern New South Wales.

Uses
The 1889 book 'The Useful Native Plants of Australia’ records that common names included "Hickory" and "Blackwood" and that "The bark (and, according to some, the leaves) of this tree was formerly used by the aboriginals [sic.] of southern New South Wales for catching fish. They would throw them into a waterhole  when the fish would rise to the top and be easily caught. Neither the leaves nor bark contain strictly poisonous substances, but, like the other species of Acacia, they would be deleterious, owing to their astringency."

Its uses include environmental management. The tannin content of the bark is approximately 18%.

See also
List of Acacia species

References

penninervis
Trees of Australia
Fabales of Australia
Flora of the Australian Capital Territory
Flora of New South Wales
Flora of Queensland
Flora of Victoria (Australia)
Plants described in 1825
Taxa named by Augustin Pyramus de Candolle
Taxa named by Franz Sieber